Common Economic Space (CES) may refer to:
 Eurasian Economic Space, a single market covering the Eurasian Economic Union
  or Common European Economic Space (CEES), one of four projected spheres of cooperation between Russia and the European Union

See also
 Common Space (disambiguation)